Carver Houses, or George Washington Carver Houses, is a public housing development built and maintained by the New York City Housing Authority (NYCHA) in Spanish Harlem, a neighborhood of Manhattan.  

Nine of those (I-II, V-IX, XII-XIII) are fifteen stories tall, while the other four (III-IV, X-XI) are six stories tall. The development is bordered by East 99th Street to the south, East 106th Street to the north, Park Avenue to the east, and Madison Avenue to the west. In addition, East 102nd Street and East 104th Street run through the campus. The nine buildings of Carver Houses have a total of 1,246 apartments housing approximately 2,723 residents.

About 
The Carver houses replaced brownstones and tenement buildings which were demolished through slum clearance, displacing residents. During construction, crews discovered they were building over Montague's Creek, which fed into Hell Gate. The first buildings of the development were completed in 1955, and the complete development was finished on January 31, 1958. Kahn & Jacobs designed the complex which is named after George Washington Carver (1864-1943), an African American chemist, botanist, and educator who, despite being born a slave, developed many uses for soybeans, peanuts, and sweet potatoes. The playground was designed by landscape architect M. Paul Friedberg whose climbable sculpture was inspired by Isamu Noguchi. The project was funded by the state and rentals cost $12 a room. Once completed, the neighborhood saw a population decrease from over 2,000 residents to around 1,200.

In December 1970, led by the Young Lords, tenants organized a rent strike until NYCHA provided more police officers to help preserve their community.

In 2007, GrowNYC installed a community garden on the property.

As of 2019, Shaun Commodore is serving as Resident Association President for Carver Houses, and is a member of the Manhattan South District Citywide Council of Presidents.

In 2020, Trust Republic Land, Mount Sinai and NYCHA partnered up to bring Carver Houses the first outdoor Adult Fitness Zone on NYCHA grounds. This Fitness Zone has serviced the community well and has brought hope to the residents.

Carver Houses is serviced by the twenty-third precinct of the New York City Police Department, and is governed by Manhattan Community Board 11.

Notable people 

 Gregorio Marzán (1906–1997), Puerto Rican artist

See also
New York City Housing Authority
List of New York City Housing Authority properties

References

Residential buildings completed in 1958
Public housing in Manhattan
East Harlem
Residential skyscrapers in Manhattan